Paul Anthony Wilson (born 2 August 1968 in Bradford) is an English former professional footballer who played in the Football League as a midfielder for Huddersfield Town, Northampton Town, Halifax Town, Burnley, York City, Scunthorpe United and Cambridge United.

References

External links
 

1968 births
Living people
English footballers
Association football defenders
Huddersfield Town A.F.C. players
Norwich City F.C. players
Northampton Town F.C. players
Halifax Town A.F.C. players
Burnley F.C. players
York City F.C. players
Scunthorpe United F.C. players
Cambridge United F.C. players
Rushden & Diamonds F.C. players
English Football League players
Footballers from Bradford